Bud is a former municipality in Møre og Romsdal county, Norway. The municipality existed from 1838 until its dissolution in 1964 when it was merged into Fræna Municipality (now part of the present-day Hustadvika Municipality).  The  municipality was centered around the village of Bud which was the administrative centre of the municipality. Bud Church was the main church for the municipality.

History
On 1 January 1838, the prestegjeld (parish) of Bud was established as a municipality (see formannskapsdistrikt law). On 1 January 1878, one area of Bud (population: 15) was transferred to the neighboring Kvernes Municipality. Then on 1 January 1891, the Bollien farm area (population: 15) was also transferred to Kvernes Municipality. On 1 July 1918, Bud Municipality was divided in two: the eastern part remained as Bud (population: 1,397) and the western part became the new Hustad Municipality (population: 2,062).

During the 1960s, there were many municipal mergers across Norway due to the work of the Schei Committee. On 1 January 1964, there was a merger involving Bud Municipality (population: 1,610) in the west, Hustad Municipality (population: 2,196) in the north, and Fræna Municipality (population: 3,430) in the south, forming a new, larger Fræna Municipality.

Government
All municipalities in Norway, including Bud, are responsible for primary education (through 10th grade), outpatient health services, senior citizen services, unemployment and other social services, zoning, economic development, and municipal roads.  The municipality is governed by a municipal council of elected representatives, which in turn elects a mayor.

Municipal council
The municipal council  of Bud was made up of 17 representatives that were elected to four year terms.  The party breakdown of the final municipal council was as follows:

See also
List of former municipalities of Norway

References

Hustadvika (municipality)
Former municipalities of Norway
1838 establishments in Norway
1964 disestablishments in Norway